Digitalis ambigua can refer to:

Digitalis ambigua Murray, a synonym of Digitalis grandiflora Mill.
Digitalis ambigua Willd. ex Ledeb., a synonym of Pennellianthus frutescens (Lamb.) Crosswh.